Shirgj (sometimes Shirq) is a settlement in the former Dajç municipality, Shkodër County, northern Albania. At the 2015 local government reform it became part of the municipality Shkodër.

At the banks of the river Buna a little bit outside the village lie the ruins of the Shirgj Church from the late 13th century.

References

Dajç, Shkodër
Populated places in Shkodër
Villages in Shkodër County